The flame-crested manakin (Heterocercus linteatus) is a species of bird in the family Pipridae. It is found in Bolivia, Brazil, and Peru. Its natural habitats are subtropical or tropical moist lowland forest and subtropical or tropical swampland.

References

flame-crested manakin
Birds of the Amazon Basin
flame-crested manakin
Taxonomy articles created by Polbot